Diamphipnoidae is a family of stoneflies in the order Plecoptera. There are at least two genera and about nine described species in Diamphipnoidae.

Genera
These two genera belong to the family Diamphipnoidae:
 Diamphipnoa Gerstaecker, 1873
 Diamphipnopsis Illies, 1960

References

Further reading

 
 
 
 
 

Plecoptera
Plecoptera families
Aquatic insects